In 2019 the state government decided to provide subsidy up to Rs 2.5 crore to filmmakers of English, Hindi or other language films that would promote Odisha and its culture, heritage and tourist destinations in their films. The decision was taken to encourage the filmmakers to shoot in Odisha. To enhance the ease of filming and facilitate the development of related institutions, the Odisha State Film Policy, 2019 proposes to implement a single window approval process for shooting of films in the state. It is proposed that all proposals for film cities, multiplexes and cinema halls will be facilitated through the government's single window for investors facilitation and tracking portal.

Odia films which convey 'Aesthetic Excellence, high technical standards and Social relevance up to two additional eligible films by the same filmmakers will be provided with a subsidy up to Rs 4 crore.

Objectives
The key objectives of Odisha State Film Policy are :

To promote quality Odia films.
To facilitate film tourism in the state.
To bring Odisha as a destination for film shooting.

Support
Single Window Approval Process for films shooting in Odisha will be provided.
Investors will apply through GOSWIFT portal for approval and clearances.
To encourage filmmakers to shoot in Odisha certain subsidy will be provided.

Incentives
The following incentives will be provided for development of Film Cities, Cinema Halls & Multiplexes in Odisha:

Capital investment subsidy
Land allotment
Interest Subsidy
Stamp duty exemption
Reimbursement of Land Conversion charges
Reimbursement of SGST
Exemption on electricity duty
Environmental protection infrastructure subsidy
Up gradation of screening infrastructure

Movies Under This Policy

By Year
2019

See also 
 Make in Odisha
 Invest Odisha

References 

Odisha
Cinema of Odisha